YCCC may refer to:
 Yorkshire County Cricket Club, Yorkshire, England.
 York County Community College, Wells, Maine, United States.
 Youth Cricket Club of Carolina, Greensboro, North Carolina